The Cats, previously known as The Hustlin' Kind, were a ska ensemble from Mile End, London. The group's lineup comprised Tyrone Patterson (keyboards), Richard Archer (bass), John Kpiaye (guitar), and Michael Okoro (drums).

History
They were initially an instrumental band, playing ska and soul covers in London clubs, changing the band name to The Cats in Summer 1968. The group recorded ten tracks at Maximum Sound studios in Old Kent Road in September 1968.

Their 1968 single, "Swan Lake", backed by "Swing Low", hit no. 48 in the UK Singles Chart in early 1969, making them the first British reggae band to have a top fifty hit in the UK. According to Kpiaye "Swan Lake" was recorded during the Maximum Sound session, the single was released on the group's own Baf label. "Swan Lake" was later covered by Madness on their debut album One Step Beyond...; Subsequent releases by The Cats failed to chart, rendering them as one-hit wonders.

Discography

Singles

References

English ska musical groups
British reggae musical groups
Black British musical groups
Musical groups from London
Musical groups established in 1967
Musical groups disestablished in 1971
1967 establishments in England